Guillem Bauzà Mayol (born 25 October 1984) is a Spanish footballer who plays for Welsh club Merthyr Town as a striker, second striker or attacking midfielder.

He spent most of his career in Wales and England, in representation of several clubs including Swansea City. He gained 16 caps for Spain at youth level.

Club career

Spain
Born in Palma, Majorca, Bauzà joined hometown club RCD Mallorca's youth system at a very early age. He only appeared for the reserves during his tenure.

In 2005, after the team's relegation to Tercera División, Bauzà signed with RCD Espanyol B also in that level, helping the side return to Segunda División B in his first season.

Swansea City
In the summer of 2007, Bauzà joined Swansea City, being one of Spanish manager Roberto Martínez's first signings alongside countryman Àngel Rangel. He scored twice in a 5–2 victory over Dutch amateurs Alphense Boys during pre-season, but took time to settle into the team as his only starts were in cup games, his first competitive goal coming against Wycombe Wanderers in the Football League Trophy. His first league goal came on 12 January 2008, in a 3–1 win at Luton Town.

Later during the campaign, Bauzà wrote his name in the club's history books when, on 12 April 2008, he netted a brace against Gillingham to secure the Swans' promotion to the Football League Championship. Two weeks later he scored his first hat-trick, helping defeat Leyton Orient 4–1 at the Liberty Stadium in the final matchday; subsequently, as his contract was due to expire, he agreed to a new performance-related deal.

In 2009–10, Bauzà was restricted to just seven appearances overall as new manager Paulo Sousa signed five new strikers in an attempt to replace Wigan Athletic-bound Jason Scotland. On 10 May 2010, he was released.

Later years
On 16 September 2010, after an unsuccessful trial at Charlton Athletic, Bauzà signed a deal with League Two club Hereford United until January 2011. He scored from a penalty kick on his debut away against Bury, two days later (1–1 draw).

On 11 March 2011, Bauzà signed a monthly contract with fellow league team Northampton Town until the end of the season. His solid displays earned him the offer of a new deal, but it was rejected.

On 15 May 2011, Bauzà joined League One side Exeter City on a free transfer as a replacement for the departing Ryan Harley. He scored in his first competitive match, a 2–0 win against Yeovil Two at St James Park in the first round of the Football League Cup.

Bauzà was released by Exeter on 30 April 2013, with manager Paul Tisdale suggesting that a lack of funding had forced him to trim the size of squad. In late October, he moved to Port Talbot Town F.C. in the Welsh Premier League.

In July 2015, Bauzà graduated with a first class honours degree from Swansea University's College of Medicine, and discussed studying for a PhD.

International career
Bauzà won the 2001 UEFA European Under-16 Championship with Spain, featuring in all six games in the tournament and sharing teams with Fernando Torres, who went on to play for the likes of Atlético Madrid, Liverpool and Chelsea. Both were also teammates at under-17 and under-19 levels.

Honours

Club
Swansea City
Football League One: 2007–08

Merthyr Town
Southern Football League: 2014–15

Country
Spain U16
UEFA European Under-16 Championship: 2001

References

External links

1984 births
Living people
Footballers from Palma de Mallorca
Spanish footballers
Association football midfielders
Association football forwards
Segunda División B players
Tercera División players
RCD Mallorca B players
RCD Espanyol B footballers
English Football League players
Swansea City A.F.C. players
Hereford United F.C. players
Northampton Town F.C. players
Exeter City F.C. players
Cymru Premier players
Port Talbot Town F.C. players
Spain youth international footballers
Spanish expatriate footballers
Expatriate footballers in Wales
Expatriate footballers in England
Spanish expatriate sportspeople in Wales
Spanish expatriate sportspeople in England